Lawn bowls Mixed pairs B2–3 at the 2022 Commonwealth Games was held at the Victoria Park   from July 31 to August 5. A total of 12 athletes from 6 associations participated in the event.

Sectional play
The top four advance to the knockout stage.

Knockout stage

External links
Results

References

Mixed pairs B2-3